Avondale High School is a public high school in Auburn Hills, Michigan, United States. It serves grades 9-12 for the Avondale School District.

Academics

Avondale High School has been accredited by Cognia or its predecessors since 1954. U.S. News & World Report ranked Avondale 247th in Michigan and 7,332nd nationally in their 2020 annual survey of public high schools.

Demographics
The demographic breakdown of the 1,020 students enrolled for 2018-19 was:
Male - 48.6%
Female - 51.4%
Native American/Alaskan - 0.6%
Asian - 6.0%
Black - 28.2%
Hispanic - 9.3%
Native Hawaiian/Pacific islanders - 0.1%
White - 53.3%
Multiracial - 2.5%
Students eligible for free or reduced-cost lunch - 39.1%.

Athletics
Avondale's Yellow Jackets compete in the Oakland Activities Association. The school colors are purple and gold. The following Michigan High School Athletic Association (MHSAA) sanctioned sports are offered:

Baseball (boys) 
Basketball (girls and boys) 
Boys state champion - 2002
Bowling (girls and boys) 
Competitive cheerleading (girls) 
Cross country (girls and boys)
Boys state champion - 1972
Football (boys) 
Golf (girls and boys) 
Gymnastics (girls) 
Ice hockey (boys) 
Lacrosse (girls and boys) 
Skiing (girls and boys) 
Soccer (girls and boys) 
Boys state champion - 2011
Softball (girls) 
Swim and dive (girls and boys) 
Tennis (girls and boys) 
Track and field (girls and boys) 
Boys state champion - 2012
Volleyball (girls) 
Wrestling (boys)

Notable alumni
Greg Hildebrandt and Tim Hildebrandt '54, science fiction artists and co-designers of the original Star Wars poster 
David Holston '04, professional basketball player
Mike Lewis, '02, former Arena Football League player and 2005 MIAA Defensive MVP.
John Morton '88, football coach and former Offensive Coordinator for the New York Jets. 
Elizabeth Reaser '93, actress

References

External links

Public high schools in Michigan
Educational institutions established in 1952
High schools in Oakland County, Michigan
1952 establishments in Michigan
Schools in Auburn Hills, Michigan